Damak may refer to:

Places
 Damak, a municipality in Nepal
 Damak Multiple Campus, a community campus in Damak, Nepal
 Damak Model Higher Secondary School, a secondary school also in Damak, Nepal
 Himalaya Higher Secondary School, Damak, Jhapa, a different secondary school in Damak, Nepal
 Damak, Hungary, a village
 , river in India
 Damak-e Aliabad, a village in Iran
 Damak (state constituency) in Pahang, Malaysia
 , village in Serdang Bedagai Regency, North Sumatra Province, Indonesia
 , village in Deli Serdang Regency, Indonesia
 , ridge in Turkey
 , village in Serdang Bedagai Regency, North Sumatra Province, Indonesia
 , village in Serdang Bedagai Regency, North Sumatra Province, Indonesia
 Kampung Damak, a polling district in Jerantut (federal constituency)
 , village in Langkat Regency, North Sumatra Province, Indonesia
 , river in Indonesia
 , point in Indonesia

Other 
 Damak, a 1967 film featuring Kasma Booty
 Damak, a character in the 1977 film Jay Vejay

See also
 DAMAC (disambiguation)